Konotop  is a village in the administrative district of Gmina Drawno, within Choszczno County, West Pomeranian Voivodeship, in north-western Poland.

Between 1871 and 1945 the area was part of Germany.

References

Konotop